Following the definition that a civilian is someone who is not part of their country's armed forces, these are suborbital space flights with a fully civilian crew:

List

Color:

See also
List of fully civilian crewed orbital spaceflights

References

Bibliography
 

Civilian crewed
1960s in spaceflight
2000s in spaceflight
2010s in spaceflight
2020s in spaceflight
Suborbital human spaceflights